The Invisible Man is a 2020 science fiction horror film written and directed by Leigh Whannell. Inspired by H. G. Wells' novel of the same name, it stars Elisabeth Moss as a woman who believes she is being stalked and gaslit by her seemingly deceased ex-boyfriend (Oliver Jackson-Cohen) after he acquires the ability to become invisible. Aldis Hodge, Storm Reid, Harriet Dyer, and Michael Dorman appear in supporting roles.

Development on a contemporary film adaptation of the novel began in 2006, but was halted in 2011. An attempt at reviving the project in 2016 as part of Universal Pictures' cinematic Dark Universe was also cancelled following the critical and financial failure of The Mummy in 2017. After Universal moved away from a serialized universe to standalone films, the project reentered development in 2019 with Whannell attached.

The Invisible Man was released in the United States on February 28, 2020. It received positive reviews from critics, with praise for Moss's performance and themes on domestic abuse. The film was also a commercial success, grossing $145 million worldwide against a $7 million budget. Due to its theatrical release being cut short by the COVID-19 pandemic, the film was made available for digital rental three weeks after it premiered in the United States.

Plot 
Cecilia Kass is trapped in a violent and controlling relationship with wealthy optics engineer and businessman Adrian Griffin. One night, Cecilia drugs Adrian with her diazepam and escapes his highly secured house with the assistance of her younger sister, Emily.

Cecilia hides out in the home of her childhood friend, Detective James Lanier and his teenage daughter, Sydney. Two weeks after Cecilia's escape, Adrian seemingly commits suicide and leaves her $5 million. His lawyer brother, Tom, handles the arrangements. Cecilia suspects another presence in the house after several strange events, but James assures her she is just traumatized and paranoid. During a job interview, she finds her work portfolio's contents removed, then faints. The doctor says high levels of diazepam were found in her system. In her bathroom, she finds the same bottle of bloodied diazepam with which she drugged Adrian during her escape.

Cecilia, accompanied by James, meets with Tom. She believes that Adrian faked his death and used his optics expertise to become invisible in order to torment her, but this idea is rebuffed. Later, Sydney is hit by an unseen force while comforting Cecilia; assuming that Cecilia did it and is becoming unbalanced, she and James leave. Alone at the house, Cecilia tries various tactics to catch the figure she believes hit Sydney. She finds Adrian's phone in the attic, on which she immediately receives a text saying "surprise".  Cecilia dumps paint down the attic trap door and it coats a previously invisible figure.  A violent struggle ensues but she escapes. She goes to Adrian's home to investigate his lab, where she finds an additional invisible bodysuit, confirming her suspicions. Right after she hides the suit in their former bedroom's closet, the invisible figure attacks again, so she flees and contacts Emily. The pair meet at a restaurant, where the invisible figure slits Emily's throat and places the knife in Cecilia's hand, framing her for murder.

While awaiting trial, Cecilia is remanded to a psychiatric hospital, where she learns she is pregnant. Tom offers to get her charges dropped if she agrees to "return to him" and raise the child, implying that Tom helped stage his brother's suicide. He reveals Adrian tampered with her birth control to impregnate her. Cecilia refuses the offer and steals a fountain pen from him. That night she attempts suicide and lures out the invisible figure. When the figure tries to stop her, she stabs him repeatedly with the pen, causing the suit to malfunction. The security team arrives, but the figure incapacitates them before fleeing the hospital, with Cecilia in pursuit. To protect her unborn child, the figure instead threatens to attack those she loves.

Cecilia races to James's house and finds the figure attacking him and Sydney. She shoots the figure to death but finds Tom in the suit. Police storm Adrian's house and find him alive, tied up and claiming that Tom held him prisoner. They conclude that Tom killed Emily as well, but Cecilia believes that Adrian set his brother up as the scapegoat for his crimes.

To get Adrian's confession, a now exonerated Cecilia meets him at his house secretly wearing a wire, while James listens in from a few blocks away. She agrees to mend their relationship, but only if he confesses to killing Emily. Adrian insists that Tom was responsible, but claims that the experience changed his outlook on life and how he treated her. After Adrian says the word "surprise", Cecilia excuses herself. Moments later, the security camera captures Adrian seemingly slitting his own throat. Cecilia returns and calls 911, apparently distraught. Out of the camera's sight, however, she stares coldly at a dying Adrian and taunts him, indicating that she had used the spare bodysuit to kill him.

When James arrives, Cecilia confirms what the camera captured. He notices she is carrying the suit, but allows her to leave.

Cast
 Elisabeth Moss as Cecilia "Cee" Kass, an architect
 Aldis Hodge as James Lanier, a San Francisco police detective, Sydney's father, and Cecilia's childhood friend
 Storm Reid as Sydney "Sid" Lanier, James's teenage daughter
 Oliver Jackson-Cohen as Adrian Griffin, a scientist specializing in optics
 Harriet Dyer as Emily "Em" Kass, Cecilia's younger sister
 Michael Dorman as Tom Griffin, Adrian's older brother and lawyer

Additional cast members include Renee Lim as Doctor Lee, Nicholas Hope as the head doctor at the psychiatric hospital, Nash Edgerton as a security guard, and Anthony Brandon Wong as a motorist whose vehicle is taken by Cecilia. Benedict Hardie, who appeared in director Leigh Whannell's previous film Upgrade, plays Marc, an architect at a firm that Cecilia interviews for.

Production
Development of a new The Invisible Man film began as early as 2006 when David S. Goyer was hired to write the screenplay. Goyer remained attached to the project as late as 2011, with little to no further development on the film. In February 2016, the project was revived with Johnny Depp cast as the titular character and Ed Solomon writing the screenplay. It was revealed to be part of an intended cinematic universe featuring Universal Pictures' modern-day reboot of their classic monsters. The would-be film series was set to begin in 2017 with The Mummy, starring Tom Cruise, Sofia Boutella, and Russell Crowe. The Mummy director Alex Kurtzman stated that fans should expect at least one film per year from the series. However, once The Mummy was released to negative critical reception and box office returns deemed by the studio as insufficient, changes were made to the Dark Universe to focus on individual storytelling and move away from the shared universe concept.

In January 2019, Universal announced that all future movies on their horror characters would focus on standalone stories, avoiding inter-connectivity. Successful horror film producer Jason Blum, founder of production company Blumhouse Productions, had at various times publicly expressed his interest in reviving and working on future installments within the Dark Universe films. The Invisible Man was set to be written and directed by Leigh Whannell and produced by Blum, but would not star Depp as previously reported. Whannell said the film was never planned to be a part of the Dark Universe. In March 2019, Elisabeth Moss entered early negotiations to star, with her official casting the following month. Storm Reid, Aldis Hodge, and Harriet Dyer later joined the cast, with Oliver Jackson-Cohen set to play the titular role in July. Jessica McNamee auditioned for Dyer's role. Principal photography began on July 16, 2019, and ended on September 17, 2019, in Sydney, Australia. During production, Whannell would work with Moss to make adjustments to the script to better portray a woman's perspective.

Music 

Benjamin Wallfisch composed the music for the film. The score album was released on February 21, 2020 by Back Lot Music, a week before the film's release. It was released in double LP vinyl formats on June 5, 2020 by Mondo.

Release
The Invisible Man was theatrically released in the United States on February 28, 2020, by Universal Pictures. It was originally scheduled for release on March 13, 2020, but in August 2019 was moved up two weeks. As pandemic restrictions were loosened, the film was released in three Santikos Theatres locations in San Antonio, Texas on May 1, 2020. The film was released in Mainland China, on December 4, 2020.

On March 16, 2020, Universal Pictures announced that the film would be released digitally in the United States and Canada through Premium VOD on March 20, just three weeks after the film's theatrical debut and before the end of the usual 90-day theatrical run. This was because of movie theater closures that started in mid March because of the COVID-19 pandemic restrictions. Other films distributed by the studio, such as The Hunt and Trolls World Tour, were also released earlier than expected for the same reason.

Reception

Box office
The Invisible Man grossed $70.4 million in the United States and Canada, and $74.1 million in other countries, for a worldwide total of $144.5 million, against a production budget of $7 million.

In the United States and Canada, the film was projected to gross $24–30 million from 3,610 theaters in its opening weekend. It made $9.9 million on its first day, including $1.65 million from Thursday night previews. The film went on to debut to $28.2 million, topping the box office. The film made $15.1 million in its second weekend (dropping 46%) and then $5.9 million in its third weekend. In the film's fourth weekend, due to the mass theater closures around the country caused by the COVID-19 pandemic, it made $64,000 from 111 locations, mostly drive-in theaters.

The film continued to play almost exclusively at drive-ins in the following weeks; it made $444,000 in its 13th weekend, $320,800 in its 14th, and $209,000 in its 15th. The film reclaimed the top spot atop the box office in its 16th weekend, making $383,000 from 187 theaters.

Critical response

Review aggregator website Rotten Tomatoes reported that 92% of 415 reviews of the film were positive with an average rating of 7.7/10. The site's critics consensus reads: "Smart, well-acted, and above all scary, The Invisible Man proves that sometimes, the classic source material for a fresh reboot can be hiding in plain sight." As of 2022, Rotten Tomatoes ranks it as the 9th best horror film of all time. Metacritic assigned a weighted average score of 72 out of 100, based on 58 critics, indicating "generally favorable reviews". Audiences polled by CinemaScore gave the film an average grade of "B+" on an A+ to F scale, and PostTrak reported it received an overall positive score of 76% and an average four out of five stars, with 53% of people they polled saying they would definitely recommend the film.

Manohla Dargis of The New York Times wrote that Moss's performance "gives the movie its emotional stakes," adding, "while her agony can be unnerving, it is even more shivery when her weeping stops and this horror-movie damsel in distress becomes a threat." Writing for The A.V. Club, Jesse Hassenger gave the film a "B+", also praising Moss's performance and the film's centering of her character's experience; the publication followed up with a video review from senior writer Katie Rife and Ignatiy Vishnevetsky, who also gave a positive review, for the aesthetic and filmmaking of Blumhouse Productions and Moss's performance. Alison Willmore of Vulture commented about the effectiveness of Moss's facial expressions, and said that she "has established herself as an empress of the onscreen breakdown, our lady of ruined eye makeup". Patrick Cavanaugh of ComicBook.com gave the film four out of five stars, and wrote that Whannell's film is "an experience that is both effective as a full-blown horror film and as a chilling reminder of the abuse one can suffer from a supposed loved one."

Conversely, Nicholas Barber from BBC gave the film two out of five stars, opining that "the latest remake of the HG Wells tale offers a timely feminist spin – but it's lacking in thrills." He criticized the film's vagueness, concluding, "at a time when small-scale horror movies can be as stunning as A Quiet Place and Get Out, a film as perfunctory as The Invisible Man feels insulting." Jake Coyle of the Associated Press was also less than positive, describing it as " a bracingly modern #MeToo allegory that, despite its brutal craft, rings hollow." Sarah-Tai Black of The Globe and Mail gave the film two out of four stars, writing: "While chock full of relatively good scares, campy effects, and an ending that will tickle a very specific demographic of 1990s and 2000s thriller fans with glee, The Invisible Man doesn’t deliver more than that."

The Invisible Man appeared on 51 critics' year-end top-10 lists, including six second-place rankings.

Accolades

Future
 The Invisible Woman: In November 2019, it was announced that a spin-off film centered around the female counterpart to Invisible Man was in development. Elizabeth Banks was set to star in, direct, and produce a new adaptation of The Invisible Woman (1940), based on her own original story pitch. Erin Cressida Wilson will write the script for the reboot of the female monster, while Max Handelman and Alison Small will serve as producer and executive producer, respectively. Banks was allowed to choose a project by Universal Pictures from the roster of Universal Classic Monsters, ultimately choosing The Invisible Woman.
 Untitled sequel: In February 2020, after the release of the first film, Whannell and Moss stated that the movie was standalone with a definitive ending. Whannell explained that once the movie is released, and some time passes he may consider working on a follow-up film. In May, Whannell and Blum stated that discussions regarding a sequel were ongoing. By June when asked about a sequel, Moss stated: "Look, if people want it that's kind of a big part of what we need in order to do it. So put the word out there that YOU want it and then I'll help!" In July 2020, it was officially announced that Whannell is working on a sequel to The Invisible Man.

References

External links

 
 
 
 

2020 films
2020 science fiction horror films
Australian science fiction horror films
American science fiction horror films
2020 independent films
Blumhouse Productions films
Films about domestic violence
Films about invisibility
Films about mass murder
Films based on The Invisible Man
Films directed by Leigh Whannell
Films produced by Jason Blum
Films scored by Benjamin Wallfisch
Films set in 2020
Films set in San Francisco
Films shot in Sydney
Films with screenplays by Leigh Whannell
Universal Monsters
Universal Pictures films
2020s English-language films
2020s American films